Pterygia sinensis is a species of small sea snail, a gastropod mollusk in the family Mitridae, the miters or miter snails.

Description
Shell length around 40 mm.

Distribution
This species is seen around Japan (south of Kii Peninsula), Taiwan (Tainan, Hsiao Liouciou Island and Penghu) and Mainland China in West Pacific Ocean.。

Habitat in sand of depth 30–300 m.

References

External links

sinensis
Molluscs of the Pacific Ocean
Molluscs described in 1844
Taxa named by Lovell Augustus Reeve